Beinn Bhreac (Gaelic for "speckled hill") is a name shared by a number of Scottish hills and mountains:
Beinn Bhreac (Glen Derry), a Munro in the Cairngorms
Beinn Bhreac (Blair Atholl), a Marilyn in the Cairngorms
Beinn Bhreac (Barcaldine), a Marilyn in the Southern Highlands
Beinn Bhreac (Arrochar), a Marilyn in the Southern Highlands
Beinn Bhreac (Broom), or "Meall Dubh", a Marilyn in the Highlands
Beinn Bhreac (Arran), a Marilyn on the Isle of Arran
Beinn Bhreac (Inveraray), a Marilyn in the Western Highlands
Beinn Bhreac (Kyles of Bute), a Marilyn in the Western Highlands
Beinn Bhreac (North Jura), a Marilyn on Jura
Beinn Bhreac (Minginish), a Marilyn on the Minginish peninsula, Isle of Skye
Beinn Bhreac (Paps of Jura), a Marilyn on Jura
Beinn Bhreac (Waternish), a Marilyn on the Waternish peninsula, Isle of Skye
Beinn Bhreac (Moidart), a Marilyn in the North-west Highlands
Beinn Bhreac (Lewis), a Marilyn on the Isle of Lewis

See also
 Binn Bhreac or Benbrack,, a Marilyn in the Twelve Bens range, in Connemara, in Ireland